Faramarz Assef (born 27 October 1950 in Abadan, Iran) is an Iranian music artist and former long and triple jumper who won a bronze medal at the 1974 Asian Games in Tehran in triple jump.

Music career 
As a graduate in architecture from University of Southern California (USC), Assef began his music career in Los Angeles, California in 1984. Since then, he has produced eight albums titled AFRA 1-8 along with four single songs. His most famous song, "Haji", brought him to the attention of Iranian communities around the world. Due to his sport background, Faramarz Assef is referred to as a bird with iron wings in Iranian pop music. He married Yalda in 2003 and has two children, his daughter Ranaa and his son Ramin.

References

External links 

 Assef on Instagram
 Assef on Facebook
 Assef on Spotify

1950 births
Living people
Iranian pop singers
Iranian male singers
People from Los Angeles
People from Abadan, Iran
Persian-language singers
Iranian male triple jumpers
Medalists at the 1974 Asian Games
Asian Games bronze medalists for Iran
Athletes (track and field) at the 1974 Asian Games
Asian Games medalists in athletics (track and field)